On My Way to the Crusades, I Met a Girl Who... is a 1967 Italian comedy film directed by Pasquale Festa Campanile and starring Tony Curtis, Monica Vitti and Hugh Griffith. It was released theatrically in the United States in September, 1969. It is also known as The Chastity Belt.

Plot
A knight is forced to leave for the crusades without having had time to consummate his marriage with a beautiful woman. As was custom during the period, he applies a chastity belt to his bride.

Cast
 Monica Vitti as Boccadoro
 Tony Curtis as Guerrando
 Hugh Griffith as Ibn-El-Rashid
 John Richardson as Dragone
 Ivo Garrani as Duca Pandolfo
 Nino Castelnuovo as Marculfo
 Francesco Mulé as Rienzi
 Franco Sportelli as Bertuccio
 Gabriella Giorgelli as Dama di compagnia
 Umberto Raho as Monk
 Leopoldo Trieste as Pescatore

Production
The film was based on "The Chastity Belt" from Bocaccio's Decameron. It was originally titled The Wrong Key. Filming took place in Rome in November 1966. During filming the title was changed to On My Way to the Crusades I Met a Girl Who... Location shooting was done around Bracciano, particularly at Castello Orsini-Odescalchi.

Reception
The film took a number of years before being released in the US.

Home Media
On February 27, 2018, the film was released on DVD under its alternate title The Chastity Belt''''' by Warner Archive Collection.

References

External links

1967 films
Films directed by Pasquale Festa Campanile
Films scored by Riz Ortolani
Italian historical comedy films
1960s historical comedy films
1960s Italian-language films
English-language Italian films
1960s English-language films
Titanus films
Films based on works by Giovanni Boccaccio
1960s multilingual films
Italian multilingual films
1960s Italian films